Mandane was a town on the coast of ancient Cilicia, between Celenderis, and Cape Pisidium or Posidium (modern Kızıl Burun), from which it was only 7 stadia distant. William Smith conjectured it to be the same place as the Myanda or Mysanda mentioned by Pliny the Elder; and if so, it must also be identical with the town of Myus (Μυούς) mentioned in the Periplus of Pseudo-Scylax between Nagidus and Celenderis. Modern scholarship does not accept the identity.

Mandane is located near Akyaka in Asiatic Turkey.

References

Populated places in ancient Cilicia
Former populated places in Turkey
History of Mersin Province